Josy Joseph is an Indian investigative journalist and author. He is the founder of Confluence Media, a platform-agnostic investigative journalism organization. He is an adjunt faculty at O. P. Jindal Global University

Early life and education 
He graduated from NSS College, Cherthala, affiliated to the University of Kerala, in Mathematics, Physics, and Statistics, and holds a Post-Graduate Diploma in Journalism. Joseph received his master's degree in International Relations in 2007 from the Global Master of Arts Program (GMAP) at The Fletcher School of Law and Diplomacy, Tufts University.

Career 

Joseph's articles have featured in publications both in India and internationally. He has reported the following stories:

"Leave Travel Concession" (LTC) scam 

Starting in August 2013, Joseph ran a series of stories showing how members of the Indian Parliament and government employees were submitting forged flight tickets to claim reimbursement, in what is now called the "leave travel concession" (LTC) scam. Many Members of Parliament and dozens of government employees are currently under criminal investigation, and the government has since revised its travel reimbursement policy.

Kickbacks in India’s Telecom Licensing 

In 2010–2011, Joseph revealed several crucial aspects of the conspiracy involved in allotting costly 2G cellular spectrum to select businesses at throwaway prices. Among those he exposed were the country's Attorney General of India and one of India's richest businessmen, Anil Ambani.

2010 Commonwealth Games 

Joseph's investigations into misdeeds, including kickbacks, front companies floated by alleged criminals, and compromises in construction and venue qualities, in the lead-up to the 2010 Commonwealth Games in New Delhi, led to a public outcry. He exposed senior ruling Congress party leader and chairman of the games organizing committee, Suresh Kalmadi, and many of India's leading sports administrators, who were later arrested and subjected to criminal investigations.

The Adarsh Housing Society Scam 

Joseph's investigation in 2010 into the construction of the Adarsh highrise apartment complex in downtown Mumbai for war widows and battle heroes revealed that the apartments were being allotted to military chiefs, political leaders, and well-connected bureaucrats. The story provoked a massive outcry and the repercussions were immediate: Maharashtra state's powerful chief minister, Ashok Chavan, whose relatives were among the apartment owners, was sacked; three ex-military chiefs publicly gave up their apartments to atone for their actions. The federal crime investigation agency arrested several people involved in the conspiracy and in December 2013, a judicial inquiry indicted four former chief ministers of Maharashtra, one of who was then the Union home minister, for allowing Adarsh to proceed in violation of existing rules.

President of BJP Party accused of money laundering 

Joseph's stories also led to the ouster of the president of India's principal political party, the BJP, in early 2013. Joseph and his team revealed that Nitin Gadkari's Purti group received investments from over 100 companies, many of which were controlled by close aides, including his driver, his accountant, and close family. Several investigative agencies are now probing the group for money laundering and other criminal acts.

Naval War Room Leak Case 

Joseph broke this story in DNA on 31 July 2005. Several follow-ups followed. It resulted in the arrest of many officers, stalled the Parliament and led to a CBI investigation. The story of how national secrets were being smuggled out of the top secret War Room in South Block continues to have reverberations even today. It resulted in a comprehensive upgrade of security in military installations.

Controversial regional peace plan for Afghanistan, Pakistan, and Kashmir by US 

In May 2003, Joseph published a five-part series on the long-term outlook for security issues in Pakistan, based on a secret roadmap for Kashmir, Afghanistan, and Pakistan prepared a year after 9/11 by the U.S. Embassy in Islamabad. The U.S. Department of State accepted the veracity of the document, but accused him of committing security breach on its premises.

Interview with Hizbul Mujahideen Chief Commander 

In April 2001, Joseph conducted one of the last known interviews of Abdul Majid Dar, the chief commander of Hizbul Mujahideen, Kashmir's biggest militant group. During the interview, Abdul Majid Dar claimed that Hizbul was opposed to suicide attacks, which the Lashkar-e-Toiba (LeT) had just begun carrying out in Kashmir. Dar was killed a few months later.

Operation Ginger 
In October 2016, Joseph along with Vijaita Singh, exposed the details of Operation Ginger, one of the deadliest cross-border surgical strikes carried out in Pakistan by the Indian Army. The details of the surgical strike, executed on 30 August 2011, were published in The Hindu—along with official documents, video and photographic evidence. Major General S.K. Chakravorty (Retd), who planned and executed the operation as the chief of Kupwara-based 28 Division, confirmed the raid to The Hindu.

Bank of Baroda’s role in South Africa’s Gupta scandal 
In February 2018, Joseph with Khadija Sharife, in a joint investigation by The Hindu and the Organized Crime and Corruption Reporting Project (OCCRP), exposed India's state-owned Bank of Baroda's crucial role in the financial machinations of South Africa's politically influential Gupta family, allowing them to move hundreds of millions of dollars originating in alleged dirty deals into offshore accounts [known as Gupta scandal], which resulted in the resignation of South African President Jacob Zuma. In February 2018, Bank of Baroda gave notification to the South African Reserve Bank that it will be exiting the country.

Confluence Media 
In November 2019, Joseph raised commitments for a seed-funding round from Accel founder Jim Swartz, among other high net-worth individuals, for his digital media startup, Confluence Media. London-based journalist and filmmaker Adrian Levy is part of the startup's core team. The startup, owned by Confluence Online Ventures, is headquartered in Delhi with offices in Mumbai and London, and aims to create an investigative journalism and real life events based IP (intellectual property) across verticals such as books, feature films, documentaries, web series, and podcasts. It plans to first establish and create revenue streams for some of the early IPs; and, subsequently, launch a news website for investigative stories. Confluence Media is currently in the process of negotiating and concluding IP-driven contracts with publishers and production houses in India and overseas.

Awards
2011: The Prem Bhatia Memorial Trust selected Josy Joseph for 'Outstanding Political Reporting of The Year', for a series of investigative reports, including the Adarsh scam, several corrupt decisions in organising the Commonwealth Games, etc.

2013: In July, he was also awarded the prestigious "Journalist of the Year (Print)" for 2010 at the Sixth Ramnath Goenka Excellence in Journalism Awards.

2014:  Joseph was the only Indian selected by the British government to the International Leaders Programme, organised by its Foreign and Commonwealth Office.

2015: In December, Joseph was honoured by his alma mater - Sainik School, Kazhakootam - with the Late Fg Offr MP Anil Kumar Memorial Achiever Award for his career accomplishments.

2018: In January, Joseph's book A Feast of Vultures, was named the best book for 2017 by the jury in the non-fiction category of the Crossword Book Award. The competing entries included books by Amitav Ghosh, Pradeep Damodaran, Pankaj Mishra, and Shashi Tharoor. While announcing the prize, the jury said: "This is a book about the truth about our nation. It confirms what we already suspect and shocks us further by unraveling the workings of the Indian system."

2019: Recipient of India Press Club of North America's Madhyamasree Puraskaram

Books

A Feast of Vultures: The Hidden Business of Democracy in India 

In an interview with Rohan Venkataramakrishnan for Scroll.in, Joseph said: "I'm the father of a 13-year-old girl. I would rather set an example for her than let my friends in the industry be happy or be scared of someone. I'm ready for it, if there is any litigation, I think it would be a great fight to have." "Very honestly, I’ve been in Delhi for 25 years, and I’ve never seen this level of self-censorship in public discourse. Ever. The worst is the self censorship that reporters are subjecting themselves to, and the distortion of facts. I hope it’s a short-lived phenomenon. In a young country like ours, you cannot suppress dissent. At least not forever." "It's an embarrassing thing for journalists, though. We've forgotten our duty and become lapdogs of the establishment. Some of us will have to stand up and fight, and be firm about values. It is when we stand up, then things will change."

In an interview with Preetha Nair for TheNewsMinute.com, Joseph said: "It is a coincidence that my book comes at a time when we are celebrating 25 years of liberalisation and 70 years of independence. A lot of us born in the socialist era have come to believe that middlemen are part of our system. Liberalisation has given a fillip to middlemen and they've grown a hundred times. If you get the right middleman, you can even buy a government. My book is an angst-ridden narrative on the distortion of our democracy." "One of the fundamental flaws in our system is that Indian politics sucks in a lot of black money and our corporates are forced to feed the political class. If we can bring transparency in political funding, that itself will diminish corruption."

In an interview with Syed Firdaus Ashraf for Rediff.com, Joseph said:"As reporters, we are always dealing with a tiny bit of a large puzzle. We are also hamstrung by space limitations, various kinds of censorships imposed by corporate, political and such interests as well as other restrictions. I wanted to report and interpret modern India without any self-censorship, varnishing or any other considerations. A Feast of Vultures is my first step in this direction."

Malayalam Edition of A Feast of Vultures 
A Feast of Vultures: The Hidden Business of Democracy in India, released in English in 2016, was translated into Malayalam by K.N. Ashok, a noted journalist and author, and published by Azhimukham Media Private Limited in July 2021. The Malayalam edition has a new introduction and additions not included in the original English edition.

The Silent Coup: A History of India’s Deep State 
Published in August 2021 by Context, an imprint of Westland Books,The Silent Coup: A History of India's Deep State covers themes such as "political corruption, money laundering, systemic issues within India’s security establishment and the threats to democracy brought about by the acts of India’s ruling elite." According to an article in the Business Standard, Joseph "opines that the threat of losing democratic ethos has been looming over India for far too long now...he tells multiple tales of how India’s security establishment and intelligence agencies have played an indelible role in weakening the democratic fabric of the country, and how they have become “willing slaves” at the hands of their powerful political masters."

Prominent commentaries 
In October 2018, Joseph wrote in the Mumbai Mirror on the removal of Central Bureau of Investigation chief Alok Verma by the Cabinet Committee on Appointment in an article titled 'This CBI crisis is not 2 officers' egos clashing': "For those who have snarled their way into power, holding onto the protective hallows of it at any cost is important. They also know that tactical rhetoric served on an hourly basis is opium enough for the larger public to forget the massive assault on democratic institutions being staged in front of them. The removal of CBI chief has to be seen in that light. The pigs of Animal Farm are now beginning to walk upright on two feet, like the humans they opposed. It is no more possible to distinguish between the saviours of democracy and its enemies. The pigs and human all look the same. Darkness does not descend on us like an iron curtain at once, but slowly drips in, drop by drop, and before we realise it would be blinding dark."

In December 2018, Joseph wrote on the death of investigative journalism in a prominent article in The Caravan Magazine, titled 'The Byline is Dead: How Indian newsrooms became morgues for investigative journalism': "Over the past few decades, Indian media is increasingly being driven by profits, and has all but abandoned its role as the fourth pillar of democracy. In this landscape, far from being appreciated, good reporting is actively censored. Editors play brokers, trying to balance various interests while maintaining a veneer of professionalism. And owners have pawned their brands for political and commercial glory. The fastest promotions and the fattest salary packages are reserved mostly for middlemen, who masquerade as journalists but primarily fix deals and manage the sundry troublemakers for the media baron—politicians, tax authorities and the police, among others."

TEDx Talk 
On 4 December 2016, Joseph delivered a TEDx Gateway Talk on 'Investigative Journalism: Silence is an Expensive Commodity', organised at the NCPA Mumbai. He spoke about how most countries that emerged from colonial rules, exist in a governance blackhole, and that at the highest levels is a grand conspiracy of silence and bewildering collusion between politicians, corporates, powerful middlemen and other players uncovered by investigative journalists like him and. He further went onto explain why it's so important to break the silence in today's immoral society.

Civil defamation suit by Jet Airways 
In December 2016, Jet Airways and its founder-chairman Naresh Goyal filed a civil defamation suit seeking ₹1,000 crore in damages against Josy Joseph, after he wrote about the alleged links between gangster Dawood Ibrahim and the airline company in his book A Feast of Vultures: The Hidden Business of Democracy in India, published by HarperCollins.

References

Sainik School alumni
Living people
Indian investigative journalists
1974 births
Journalists from Kerala
People from Alappuzha district
The Fletcher School at Tufts University alumni